Seymour Crawford (1 June 1944 – 21 October 2018) was an Irish Fine Gael politician who served as a Teachta Dála (TD) for the Cavan–Monaghan constituency from 1992 to 2011.

Crawford was first elected as a TD at the 1992 general election to the 27th Dáil. He was re-elected to Dáil Éireann at the 1997, 2002 and 2007 general elections. He was a member of Monaghan County Council from June 1991 until September 2003. In 2004, he was a Vice-Chairman of the British-Irish Inter-Parliamentary Body and a member from 1993–2007.

He was Vice-President of the Irish Farmers' Association from 1984–88. He was a member of Newbliss Presbyterian Church and was the only Ulster Protestant and Presbyterian member of the Oireachtas during his term in the Dáil. He received the Bastow Memorial Award for service in meat and livestock in 1985.

He retired from politics at the 2011 general election. Crawford's death was announced on 21 October 2018.

References

 

1944 births
2018 deaths
Politicians from County Monaghan
Irish Presbyterians
Fine Gael TDs
Members of the 27th Dáil
Members of the 28th Dáil
Members of the 29th Dáil
Members of the 30th Dáil
Irish farmers
Local councillors in County Monaghan